The Colorado Rockies' 1999 season was the seventh for the Major League Baseball (MLB) franchise located in Denver, Colorado, their seventh in the National League (NL), and fifth at Coors Field. The team competed in the National League West, finishing in fifth and last place with a record of 72–90.  Jim Leyland, a longtime manager in MLB, debuted as the Rockies' new manager, and resigned following the season.

The Rockies, along with the San Diego Padres, made MLB history on Opening Day, April 4, 1999, by playing a contest in Estadio de Béisbol Monterrey in Monterrey, Mexico, making it the first Opening Day game held outside of the United States or Canada.  Larry Walker won his second batting title by leading MLB with .379 average, setting a Rockies' club record, and the fourth-high single-season average since Ted Williams hit .406 in 1941.  Besides winning the batting championship, Walker also led the major leagues in on-base percentage (.458), and slugging percentage (.710), becoming the first player to lead MLB in all three categories since George Brett in 1980, and the first National Leaguer since Stan Musial in 1943. Despite the team hitting quite well and appearing in the league's top 4 teams in hits, runs, and batting average, the team's performance was poor; the pitching staff performed awfully, allowing 1028 total runs - a mark that, as of 2022, has not since been surpassed by any team. The team set franchise records in earned runs surrendered, walks issued, hits allowed, and ERA. The pitching staff combined for an ERA of 6.01, a new franchise-worst record that has also not since been surpassed by any team.

Offseason
October 29, 1998: John Vander Wal was traded by the Colorado Rockies to the San Diego Padres for a player to be named later. The San Diego Padres sent Kevin Burford (minors) (October 29, 1998) to the Colorado Rockies to complete the trade.
November 9, 1998: Brian Bohanon and Lenny Harris were signed as free agents by the Colorado Rockies.
November 20, 1998: Jason Bates was released by the Colorado Rockies.
December 18, 1998: Henry Blanco was signed as a free agent by the Colorado Rockies.

Regular season
On April 4, 1999, the Rockies made history as they played their Opening Day contest at Estadio de Béisbol Monterrey in Monterrey, Mexico, marking the first time Major League Baseball (MLB) commenced the regular season outside of the United States or Canada.  Their opponent were the defending National League champion San Diego Padres.  Vinny Castilla, a native of the southern Mexican state of Oaxaca, delighted the crowd with four hits including a double.  Dante Bichette also collected four hits, drove in four runs, and homered, as Colorado won 8–2.  The official attendance was 27,104.

The Rockies' scheduled home games against the Montreal Expos on April 20 and 21 were both postponed in the aftermath of the Columbine High School massacre in which 15 people, including both shooters died. The Rockies then added a "CHS" patch on the right sleeve of their jerseys which they wore for the remainder of the season.

On April 28, right fielder Larry Walker hit three home runs against the St. Louis Cardinals for his second career three home run game while contributing eight RBI in a 9–7 win.

In the May 19 contest versus the Cincinnati Reds, the Rockies were on the losing end of a 24−12 final, tied for the fourth-highest run-scoring output in MLB history.  The Reds' Jeffrey Hammonds hit three home runs; following the season, Colorado acquired him via trade.  Both Hammonds and Sean Casey totaled four hits.  Casey went on base seven times with three walks, scoring five runs, and hit two home runs and six RBI.  The Reds totaled six home runs; Brian Johnson hit the remainder.  Both Walker and Bichette had four hits.  Bichette also had five RBI, and Castilla hit a three-run home run.  Walker raised his season average to .431.

From June 18−23, Walker tied Bichette's club record by homering in five consecutive games.  The following day, Walker tied another club record, held by Andrés Galarraga, with his sixth consecutive multi-hit game.  On July 8, Walker hit his 250th career home run versus Chan Ho Park of the Los Angeles Dodgers.

Carrying a .382 first-half average, Walker had batted .390 (189 hits in 484 at bats) from the 1998 All-Star break to the same point in 1999, the equivalent of a full season.  He was named to his third consecutive All-Star team.  In the July 19 contest versus the Oakland Athletics, Walker became the second player to homer into the plaza reserve seating of the Oakland Coliseum, following Mark McGwire, who had done so three seasons earlier.

For the season, Walker batted .379 − setting a Rockies record and the fourth-highest since Ted Williams hit .406 in 1941 − while leading the major leagues in batting for a second time.  Walker also led the major leagues in offensive win % (.838), on-base percentage (.458), slugging percentage (.710), and OPS (1.168).  Sometimes referred to as the "Slash Stat Triple Crown," he became the seventh player within the previous 60 years to lead the league in each of average, OBP and SLG in the same season, and first since George Brett in 1980.  The last NL player to lead the majors in each of the three slash stat categories was Stan Musial in 1943.  Walker also hit 37 home runs and 115 RBI in just 438 at bats, stole 11 bases in 15 attempts, and registered 12 outfield assists.

Per the Elias Sports Bureau (ESB), Walker's .461 average at Coors is the highest home batting average since ESB began tracking home/road splits in 1974, and 43 points higher than any other player's in that span.

Opening Day starters

Season standings

Record vs. opponents

Notable transactions
June 2, 1999: Jason Jennings was drafted by the Colorado Rockies in the 1st round of the 1999 amateur draft. Player signed June 9, 1999.
July 2, 1999: Jeff Reed was released by the Colorado Rockies.
July 31, 1999: Darryl Hamilton was traded by the Colorado Rockies with Chuck McElroy to the New York Mets for Brian McRae, Rigo Beltrán, and Thomas Johnson (minors).
August 9, 1999: Brian McRae was traded by the Colorado Rockies to the Toronto Blue Jays for a player to be named later. The Toronto Blue Jays sent Pat Lynch (minors) (August 23, 1999) to the Colorado Rockies to complete the trade.

Major League debuts
Batters:
Chris Sexton (May 3)
Chris Petersen (May 25)
Ben Petrick (Sep 1)
Juan Sosa (Sep 10)
Pitchers:
David Lee (May 22)
Mike Porzio (Jul 9)
Luther Hackman (Sep 1)

Roster

Player stats

Batting

Starters by position 
Note: Pos = Position; G = Games played; AB = At bats; H = Hits; Avg. = Batting average; HR = Home runs; RBI = Runs batted in

Other batters 
Note: G = Games played; AB = At bats; H = Hits; Avg. = Batting average; HR = Home runs; RBI = Runs batted in

Pitching

Starting pitchers 
Note: G = Games pitched; IP = Innings pitched; W = Wins; L = Losses; ERA = Earned run average; SO = Strikeouts

Relief pitchers 
Note: G = Games pitched; W = Wins; L = Losses; SV = Saves; ERA = Earned run average; SO = Strikeouts

Other pitchers 
Note: G = Games pitched; IP = Innings pitched; W = Wins; L = Losses; ERA = Earned run average; SO = Strikeouts

Game log 

|-  style="text-align:center; background:#bfb;"
| 1 || April 4 || @ Padres || 8–2 || Kile (1–0) || Ashby (0–1) || || 27,104 || 1–0
|-  style="text-align:center; background:#fbb;"
| 2 || April 6 || @ Padres || 4–3 || Hitchcock (1–0) || Astacio (0–1) || Hoffman (1) || 61,247 || 1–1
|-  style="text-align:center; background:#fbb;"
| 3 || April 7 || @ Padres || 2–1 || Rivera (1–0) || Jones (0–1) || || 32,751 || 1–2
|-  style="text-align:center; background:#bfb;"
| 4 || April 8 || @ Dodgers || 4–2 || Bohanon (1–0) || Pérez (0–1) || Veres (1) || 27,879 || 2–2
|-  style="text-align:center; background:#fbb;"
| 5 || April 9 || @ Dodgers || 9–6 || Dreifort (1–0) || Thomson (0–1) || Shaw (2) || 39,997 || 2–3
|-  style="text-align:center; background:#fbb;"
| 6 || April 10 || @ Dodgers || 2–0 || Brown (1–0) || Kile (1–1) || Shaw (3) || 44,503 || 2–4
|-  style="text-align:center; background:#bbb;"
|   || April 11 || @ Dodgers || colspan=5 |Postponed (Rain; rescheduled for July 22) || 2–4
|-  style="text-align:center; background:#fbb;"
| 7 || April 12 || Padres || 8–5 (11) || Wall (1–0) || Veres (0–1) || Reyes (1) || 48,073 || 2–5
|-  style="text-align:center; background:#bbb;"
|   || April 14 || Padres || colspan=5 |Postponed (Snow; rescheduled for July 3) || 2–5
|-  style="text-align:center; background:#bfb;"
| 8 || April 15 || Padres || 6–4 || Bohanon (2–0) || Clement (0–2) || Veres (2) || 40,027 || 3–5
|-  style="text-align:center; background:#bbb;"
|   || April 16 || Braves || colspan=5 |Postponed (Snow; rescheduled for August 19) || 3–5
|-  style="text-align:center; background:#bfb;"
| 9 || April 17 || Braves || 5–4 || McElroy (1–0) || Rocker (1–1) || || 42,510 || 4–5
|-  style="text-align:center; background:#fbb;"
| 10 || April 18 || Braves || 20–5 || Maddux (2–0) || Astacio (0–2) || || 44,285 || 4–6
|-  style="text-align:center; background:#bfb;"
| 11 || April 19 || Expos || 11–10 || Veres (1–1) || Urbina (1–1) || || 40,209 || 5–6
|-  style="text-align:center; background:#bbb;"
|   || April 20 || Expos || colspan=5 |Postponed (Columbine High School massacre; rescheduled for August 13) || 5–6
|-  style="text-align:center; background:#bbb;"
|   || April 21 || Expos || colspan=5 |Postponed (Columbine High School massacre; rescheduled for August 15) || 5–6
|-  style="text-align:center; background:#bfb;"
| 12 || April 22 || @ Giants || 8–5 || Bohanon (3–0) || Rueter (1–1) || Veres (3) || 11,061 || 6–6
|-  style="text-align:center; background:#fbb;"
| 13 || April 23 || @ Giants || 7–2 || Ortiz (2–2) || Kile (1–2) || || 16,271 || 6–7
|-  style="text-align:center; background:#fbb;"
| 14 || April 24 || @ Giants || 8–4 || Estes (2–1) || Astacio (0–3) || || 26,626 || 6–8
|-  style="text-align:center; background:#fbb;"
| 15 || April 25 || @ Giants || 7–6 || Embree (2–0) || DeJean (0–1) || Nen (6) || 23,099 || 6–9
|-  style="text-align:center; background:#fbb;"
| 16 || April 27 || @ Cardinals || 7–5 || Oliver (2–1) || Thomson (0–2) || Radinsky (1) || 32,389 || 6–10	
|-  style="text-align:center; background:#bfb;"
| 17 || April 28 || @ Cardinals || 9–7 || Bohanon (4–0) || Jiménez (2–1) || Veres (4) || 34,545 || 7–10
|-  style="text-align:center; background:#bfb;"
| 18 || April 29 || @ Cardinals || 6–2 || Kile (2–2) || Mercker (2–1) || || 41,909 || 8–10
|-  style="text-align:center; background:#bfb;"
| 19 || April 30 || @ Pirates || 7–2 || Astacio (1–3) || Schourek (1–2) || || 17,466 || 9–10	
|-

|-  style="text-align:center; background:#fbb;"
| 20 || May 1 || @ Pirates || 9–3 || Ritchie (1–1) || Wright (0–1) || || 18,599 || 9–11
|-  style="text-align:center; background:#fbb;"
| 21 || May 2 || @ Pirates || 8–5 || Schmidt (4–1) || Thomson (0–3) || Williams (4) || 19,215 || 9–12
|-  style="text-align:center; background:#bfb;"
| 22 || May 3 || @ Cubs || 6–1 || Bohanon (5–0) || Trachsel (1–3) || || 32,085 || 10–12
|-  style="text-align:center; background:#fbb;"
| 23 || May 4 || @ Cubs || 13–12 || Beck (2–2) || DiPoto (0–1) || || 28,888 || 10–13	
|-  style="text-align:center; background:#bfb;"
| 24 || May 5 || @ Cubs || 13–6 || Astacio (2–3) || Mulholland (2–1) || || 30,079 || 11–13	
|-  style="text-align:center; background:#fbb;"
| 25 || May 7 || Phillies || 8–1 || Schilling (5–1) || Thomson (0–4) || || 41,465 || 11–14
|-  style="text-align:center; background:#fbb;"
| 26 || May 8 || Phillies || 7–2 || Bennett (1–0) || Bohanon (5–1) || || 43,340 || 11–15
|-  style="text-align:center; background:#fbb;"
| 27 || May 9 || Phillies || 10–8 || Ryan (1–1) || Veres (1–2) || Gomes (2) || 40,251 || 11–16
|-  style="text-align:center; background:#bfb;"
| 28 || May 10 || Mets || 10–3 || Astacio (3–3) || Leiter (1–4) || || 40,021 || 12–16	
|-  style="text-align:center; background:#bfb;"
| 29 || May 11 || Mets || 8–5 || Jones (1–1) || Jones (3–1) || || 40,032 || 13–16
|-  style="text-align:center; background:#fbb;"
| 30 || May 12 || Mets || 10–5 || Reed (3–1) || Thomson (0–5) || || 41,011 || 13–17
|-  style="text-align:center; background:#bfb;"
| 31 || May 14 || @ Diamondbacks || 4–1 || Bohanon (6–1) || Benes (2–4) || || 38,894 || 14–17
|-  style="text-align:center; background:#fbb;"
| 32 || May 15 || @ Diamondbacks || 9–2 || Johnson (4–1) || Kile (2–3) || || 40,853 || 14–18
|-  style="text-align:center; background:#bfb;"
| 33 || May 16 || @ Diamondbacks || 5–1 || Astacio (4–3) || Daal (3–4) || || 38,869 || 15–18
|-  style="text-align:center; background:#fbb;"
| 34 || May 17 || Reds || 7–2 || Harnisch (3–4) || Jones (1–2) || || 40,067 || 15–19
|-  style="text-align:center; background:#fbb;"
| 35 || May 18 || Reds || 5–3 || Graves (3–3) || Leskanic (0–1) || Williamson (4) || 40,032 || 15–20
|-  style="text-align:center; background:#fbb;"
| 36 || May 19 || Reds || 24–12 || Parris (2–0) || DiPoto (0–2) || Villone (1) || 41,044 || 15–21
|-  style="text-align:center; background:#bfb;"
| 37 || May 20 || Diamondbacks || 8–4 || Kile (3–3) || Johnson (4–2) || || 40,021 || 16–21
|-  style="text-align:center; background:#bfb;"
| 38 || May 21 || Diamondbacks || 8–7 (11) || Leskanic (1–1) || Frascatore (1–3) || || 44,205 || 17–21
|-  style="text-align:center; background:#fbb;"
| 39 || May 22 || Diamondbacks || 8–3 || Daal (4–4) || Jones (1–3) || || 48,594 || 17–22
|-  style="text-align:center; background:#bfb;"
| 40 || May 23 || Diamondbacks || 7–6 || McElroy (2–0) || Olson (2–3) || || 46,299 || 18–22
|-  style="text-align:center; background:#fbb;"
| 41 || May 24 || @ Astros || 5–2 || Reynolds (7–3) || Bohanon (6–2) || || 20,772 || 18–23
|-  style="text-align:center; background:#fbb;"
| 42 || May 25 || @ Astros || 2–1 (12) || Elarton (3–1) || DeJean (0–2) || || 21,720 || 18–24
|-  style="text-align:center; background:#fbb;"
| 43 || May 26 || @ Astros || 3–2 || Powell (3–1) || Astacio (4–4) || || 24,476 || 18–25
|-  style="text-align:center; background:#bfb;"
| 44 || May 27 || @ Astros || 4–3 || DiPoto (1–2) || Miller (0–1) || Veres (5) || 25,146 || 19–25
|-  style="text-align:center; background:#bfb;"
| 45 || May 28 || @ Phillies || 5–3 || Leskanic (2–1) || Byrd (6–3) || Veres (6) || 16,365 || 20–25
|-  style="text-align:center; background:#fbb;"
| 46 || May 29 || @ Phillies || 2–0 || Schilling (8–2) || Bohanon (6–3) || || 22,204 || 20–26
|-  style="text-align:center; background:#bfb;"
| 47 || May 30 || @ Phillies || 1–0 || Kile (4–3) || Poole (0–1) || Veres (7) || 30,358 || 21–26
|-  style="text-align:center; background:#fbb;"
| 48 || May 31 || @ Braves || 3–1 || Millwood (6–3) || Astacio (4–5) || Rocker (10) || 34,136 || 21–27
|-

|-  style="text-align:center; background:#fbb;"
| 49 || June 1 || @ Braves || 7–2 || Smoltz (6–1) || Jones (1–4) || || 30,297 || 21–28
|-  style="text-align:center; background:#bfb;"
| 50 || June 2 || @ Braves || 3–2 (11) || DiPoto (2–2) || Springer (0–1) || || 32,429 || 22–28
|-  style="text-align:center; background:#bfb;"
| 51 || June 4 || Brewers || 9–8 (10) || Veres (2–2) || Wickman (2–3) || || 40,064 || 23–28
|-  style="text-align:center; background:#bfb;"
| 52 || June 5 || Brewers || 12–11 || DeJean (1–2) || Plunk (0–1) || DiPoto (1) || 43,409 || 24–28
|-  style="text-align:center; background:#bfb;"
| 53 || June 6 || Brewers || 10–5 || Astacio (5–5) || Karl (5–5) || || 41,688 || 25–28
|-  style="text-align:center; background:#fbb;"
| 54 || June 7 || Mariners || 4–2 || Halama (4–2) || Jones (1–5) || Mesa (11) || 40,692 || 25–29
|-  style="text-align:center; background:#fbb;"
| 55 || June 8 || Mariners || 10–5 || Rodriguez (1–0) || Brownson (0–1) || Cloude (1) || 41,940 || 25–30
|-  style="text-align:center; background:#bfb;"
| 56 || June 9 || Mariners || 16–11 || Bohanon (7–3) || Fassero (3–7) || || 40,671 || 26–30
|-  style="text-align:center; background:#fbb;"
| 57 || June 11 || @ Rangers || 3–2 || Zimmerman (7–0) || McElroy (2–1) || Wetteland (21) || 39,627 || 26–31
|-  style="text-align:center; background:#bfb;"
| 58 || June 12 || @ Rangers || 8–7 || Astacio (6–5) || Sele (6–5) || Veres (8) || 46,851 || 27–31
|-  style="text-align:center; background:#bfb;"
| 59 || June 13 || @ Rangers || 4–2 || Jones (2–5) || Morgan (6–5) || Veres (9) || 39,651 || 28–31
|-  style="text-align:center; background:#bfb;"
| 60 || June 14 || Giants || 5–4 || Leskanic (3–1) || Johnstone (4–4) || Veres (10) || 40,029 || 29–31
|-  style="text-align:center; background:#bfb;"
| 61 || June 15 || Giants || 15–6 || Bohanon (8–3) || Brock (5–6) || || 40,037 || 30–31
|-  style="text-align:center; background:#fbb;"
| 62 || June 16 || Giants || 15–2 || Gardner (1–5) || Kile (4–4) || || 41,307 || 30–32
|-  style="text-align:center; background:#bfb;"
| 63 || June 18 || Marlins || 11–10 || McElroy (3–1) || Mantei (1–2) || || 46,394 || 31–32	
|-  style="text-align:center; background:#bfb;"
| 64 || June 19 || Marlins || 10–2 || Jones (3–5) || Fernandez (2–4) || || 47,051 || 32–32
|-  style="text-align:center; background:#bfb;"
| 65 || June 20 || Marlins || 8–7 || Bohanon (9–3) || Dempster (3–3) || Veres (11) || 47,070 || 33–32
|-  style="text-align:center; background:#fbb;"
| 66 || June 22 || Cubs || 13–12 || Sanders (2–4) || DeJean (1–3) || Aguilera (8) || 48,081 || 33–33
|-  style="text-align:center; background:#bfb;"
| 67 || June 23 || Cubs || 10–1 || Astacio (7–5) || Mulholland (3–3) || || 48,189 || 34–33
|-  style="text-align:center; background:#fbb;"
| 68 || June 24 || Cubs || 12–10 || Tapani (6–3) || Jones (3–6) || || 48,876 || 34–34
|-  style="text-align:center; background:#fbb;"
| 69 || June 25 || @ Padres || 10–1 || Boehringer (4–1) || Bohanon (9–4) || || 22,362 || 34–35
|-  style="text-align:center; background:#fbb;"
| 70 || June 26 || @ Padres || 13–6 || Clement (4–7) || Brownson (0–2) || || 47,808 || 34–36
|-  style="text-align:center; background:#fbb;"
| 71 || June 27 || @ Padres || 5–3 || Hitchcock (6–6) || Kile (4–5) || Hoffman (18) || 25,177 || 34–37
|-  style="text-align:center; background:#fbb;"
| 72 || June 28 || @ Padres || 8–7 || Williams (4–5) || Astacio (7–6) || Hoffman (19) || 41,107 || 34–38
|-  style="text-align:center; background:#fbb;"
| 73 || June 29 || @ Giants || 10–1 || Rueter (7–3) || Jones (3–7) || || 11,490 || 34–39
|-  style="text-align:center; background:#fbb;"
| 74 || June 30 || @ Giants || 4–1 || Ortiz (9–5) || Bohanon (9–5) || Nen (20) || 24,825 || 34–40
|-

|-  style="text-align:center; background:#fbb;"
| 75 || July 1 || @ Giants || 7–1 || Estes (5–5) || Kile (4–6) || || 23,172 || 34–41
|-  style="text-align:center; background:#fbb;"
| 76 || July 2 || Padres || 15–3 || Hitchcock (7–6) || Astacio (7–7) || || 41,739 || 34–42
|-  style="text-align:center; background:#bfb;"
| 77 || July 3 || Padres || 12–10 || Ramírez (1–0) || Williams (4–6) || Veres (12) || 38,375 || 35–42
|-  style="text-align:center; background:#bfb;"
| 78 || July 3 || Padres || 8–6 || Jones (4–7) || Murray (0–3) || Veres (13) || 48,750 || 36–42
|-  style="text-align:center; background:#fbb;"
| 79 || July 4 || Padres || 11–0 || Ashby (8–4) || Bohanon (9–6) || || 38,059 || 36–43
|-  style="text-align:center; background:#bfb;"
| 80 || July 5 || Dodgers || 8–4 || Kile (5–6) || Brown (9–6) || || 40,063 || 37–43
|-  style="text-align:center; background:#bfb;"
| 81 || July 6 || Dodgers || 5–2 || Astacio (8–7) || Dreifort (6–8) || || 39,979 || 38–43
|-  style="text-align:center; background:#bfb;"
| 82 || July 7 || Dodgers || 7–5 || DeJean (2–3) || Arnold (2–2) || Veres (14) || 40,221 || 39–43
|-  style="text-align:center; background:#fbb;"
| 83 || July 8 || Dodgers || 11–8 || Park (5–7) || Bohanon (9–7) || Shaw (19) || 42,024 || 39–44	
|-  style="text-align:center; background:#fbb;"
| 84 || July 9 || Angels || 9–6 || Finley (5–9) || Kile (5–7) || Percival (23) || 44,122 || 39–45
|-  style="text-align:center; background:#fbb;"
| 85 || July 10 || Angels || 9–3 || Olivares (8–6) || Astacio (8–8) || || 48,069 || 39–46
|-  style="text-align:center; background:#bfb;"
| 86 || July 11 || Angels || 8–2 || DiPoto (3–2) || Fyhrie (0–1) || || 42,585 || 40–46	
|-  style="text-align:center; background:#fbb;"
| 87 || July 15 || @ Reds || 10–7 || Parris (6–1) || Kile (5–8) || Graves (13) || 22,243 || 40–47
|-  style="text-align:center; background:#bfb;"
| 88 || July 16 || @ Reds || 6–2 || Astacio (9–8) || Villone (4–3) || Veres (15) || 29,552 || 41–47
|-  style="text-align:center; background:#fbb;"
| 89 || July 17 || @ Reds || 3–2 || Williamson (8–4) || DiPoto (3–3) || || 26,605 || 41–48
|-  style="text-align:center; background:#fbb;"
| 90 || July 18 || @ Athletics || 3–2 || Haynes (7–7) || Jones (4–8) || Taylor (24) || 15,074 || 41–49
|-  style="text-align:center; background:#fbb;"
| 91 || July 19 || @ Athletics || 10–5 || Worrell (2–1) || Ramírez (1–1) || Jones (4) || 9,281 || 41–50	
|-  style="text-align:center; background:#fbb;"
| 92 || July 20 || @ Athletics || 4–3 || Rogers (5–3) || Kile (5–9) || Taylor (25) || 13,414 || 41–51
|-  style="text-align:center; background:#bfb;"
| 93 || July 21 || @ Dodgers || 5–4 || Astacio (10–8) || Valdez (8–8) || Veres (16) || 34,271 || 42–51
|-  style="text-align:center; background:#bfb;"
| 94 || July 22 || @ Dodgers || 4–1 || Jones (5–8) || Park (6–8) || Veres (17) || 34,231 || 43–51
|-  style="text-align:center; background:#bfb;"
| 95 || July 22 || @ Dodgers || 12–11 || Lee (1–0) || Masaoka (1–2) || Veres (18) || 30,907 || 44–51
|-  style="text-align:center; background:#fbb;"
| 96 || July 23 || Cardinals || 6–4 || Oliver (5–7) || Ramírez (1–2) || Slocumb (1) || 48,824 || 44–52
|-  style="text-align:center; background:#fbb;"
| 97 || July 24 || Cardinals || 10–2 || Mercker (4–4) || Kile (5–10) || || 48,794 || 44–53
|-  style="text-align:center; background:#fbb;"
| 98 || July 25 || Cardinals || 6–4 || Luebbers (1–1) || Astacio (10–9) || Aybar (3) || 48,845 || 44–54
|-  style="text-align:center; background:#fbb;"
| 99 || July 26 || Astros || 8–5 || Williams (1–1) || Veres (2–3) || Wagner (26) || 42,740 || 44–55
|-  style="text-align:center; background:#fbb;"
| 100 || July 27 || Astros || 6–3 || Lima (14–5) || Bohanon (9–8) || Wagner (27) || 41,952 || 44–56
|-  style="text-align:center; background:#fbb;"
| 101 || July 28 || Astros || 16–8 || Hampton (14–3) || Ramírez (1–3) || || 43,201 || 44–57
|-  style="text-align:center; background:#bfb;"
| 102 || July 29 || Astros || 4–2 || Kile (6–10) || Holt (2–10) || Veres (19) || 43,415 || 45–57
|-  style="text-align:center; background:#bfb;"
| 103 || July 30 || @ Cardinals || 5–4 || Astacio (11–9) || Aybar (4–4) || Veres (20) || 46,208 || 46–57
|-  style="text-align:center; background:#fbb;"
| 104 || July 31 || @ Cardinals || 6–5 || Painter (3–4) || Leskanic (3–2) || Bottalico (17) || 46,849 || 46–58
|-

|-  style="text-align:center; background:#bfb;"
| 105 || August 1 || @ Cardinals || 5–4 || Bohanon (10–8) || Jiménez (5–11) || Veres (21) || 45,906 || 47–58
|-  style="text-align:center; background:#fbb;"
| 106 || August 3 || @ Reds || 2–1 || Williamson (10–4) || DeJean (2–4) || || 22,516 || 47–59
|-  style="text-align:center; background:#fbb;"
| 107 || August 4 || @ Reds || 6–3 || Neagle (2–3) || Kile (6–11) || Graves (16) || 22,314 || 47–60
|-  style="text-align:center; background:#bfb;"
| 108 || August 5 || @ Reds || 2–1 || Astacio (12–9) || Guzmán (5–10) || || 24,318 || 48–60	
|-  style="text-align:center; background:#fbb;"
| 109 || August 6 || @ Marlins || 9–1 || Fernandez (6–7) || Jones (5–9) || || 14,032 || 48–61	
|-  style="text-align:center; background:#fbb;"
| 110 || August 7 || @ Marlins || 4–1 || Meadows (9–11) || Bohanon (10–9) || Alfonseca (9) || 18,469 || 48–62	
|-  style="text-align:center; background:#fbb;"
| 111 || August 8 || @ Marlins || 2–1 || Dempster (5–6) || Wright (0–2) || Alfonseca (10) || 17,691 || 48–63	
|-  style="text-align:center; background:#fbb;"
| 112 || August 9 || @ Brewers || 7–6 || Wickman (3–5) || Veres (2–4) || || 17,463 || 48–64	
|-  style="text-align:center; background:#fbb;"
| 113 || August 10 || @ Brewers || 2–1 (10) || Coppinger (1–2) || Veres (2–5) || || 19,758 || 48–65	
|-  style="text-align:center; background:#bfb;"
| 114 || August 11 || @ Brewers || 8–5 || Jones (6–9) || Woodard (11–7) || || 21,632 || 49–65
|-  style="text-align:center; background:#fbb;"
| 115 || August 13 || Expos || 14–13 (10) || Urbina (6–4) || DiPoto (3–4) || Telford (2) || 40,092 || 49–66
|-  style="text-align:center; background:#fbb;"
| 116 || August 13 || Expos || 8–6 || Vázquez (6–5) || Bohanon (10–10) || Urbina (27) || 45,643 || 49–67
|-  style="text-align:center; background:#bfb;"
| 117 || August 14 || Expos || 11–8 || Kile (7–11) || Powell (1–5) || Veres (22) || 46,739 || 50–67
|-  style="text-align:center; background:#bfb;"
| 118 || August 15 || Expos || 8–2 || Thomson (1–5) || Thurman (5–8) || Ramírez (1) || 43,702 || 51–67
|-  style="text-align:center; background:#bfb;"
| 119 || August 15 || Expos || 12–4 || Astacio (13–9) || Bennett (0–1) || || 36,483 || 52–67
|-  style="text-align:center; background:#fbb;"
| 120 || August 16 || Braves || 14–6 || Maddux (15–6) || Jones (6–10) || || 47,519 || 52–68	
|-  style="text-align:center; background:#bfb;"
| 121 || August 17 || Braves || 3–2 || Lee (2–0) || Mulholland (7–7) || Veres (23) || 47,904 || 53–68	
|-  style="text-align:center; background:#bfb;"
| 122 || August 18 || Braves || 4–1 || Veres (3–5) || Rocker (3–4) || || 46,553 || 54–68
|-  style="text-align:center; background:#fbb;"
| 123 || August 19 || Braves || 9–7 (14) || Chen (2–2) || Lee (2–1) || Mulholland (1) || 41,791 || 54–69	
|-  style="text-align:center; background:#bfb;"
| 124 || August 20 || @ Cubs || 11–3 || Astacio (14–9) || Farnsworth (2–7) || || 40,130 || 55–69	
|-  style="text-align:center; background:#fbb;"
| 125 || August 21 || @ Cubs || 8–6 || Bowie (1–3) || Thomson (1–6) || Adams (10) || 40,087 || 55–70	
|-  style="text-align:center; background:#bfb;"
| 126 || August 22 || @ Cubs || 3–2 || Wright (1–2) || Trachsel (4–15) || Veres (24) || 38,424 || 56–70
|-  style="text-align:center; background:#bfb;"
| 127 || August 24 || @ Pirates || 3–2 || Leskanic (4–2) || Williams (2–4) || Veres (25) || 13,221 || 57–70
|-  style="text-align:center; background:#fbb;"
| 128 || August 25 || @ Pirates || 9–3 || Peters (2–1) || Kile (7–12) || || 12,535 || 57–71	
|-  style="text-align:center; background:#fbb;"
| 129 || August 26 || @ Pirates || 8–4 || Anderson (2–1) || Astacio (14–10) || || 12,649 || 57–72
|-  style="text-align:center; background:#bbb;"
|   || August 27 || Phillies || colspan=5 |Postponed (Rain; Rescheduled for August 28) || 57–72
|-  style="text-align:center; background:#bfb;"
| 130 || August 28 || Phillies || 11–6 || Lee (3–1) || Aldred (4–3) || || 42,744 || 58–72	
|-  style="text-align:center; background:#bfb;"
| 131 || August 28 || Phillies || 4–0 || Bohanon (11–10) || Grahe (0–1) || || 47,217 || 59–72
|-  style="text-align:center; background:#bfb;"
| 132 || August 29 || Phillies || 6–5 || Kile (8–12) || Byrd (14–7) || Veres (26) || 43,344 || 60–72	
|-  style="text-align:center; background:#fbb;"
| 133 || August 30 || Pirates || 11–8 || Peters (3–1) || Ramírez (1–4) || Williams (22) || 41,872 || 60–73	
|-  style="text-align:center; background:#fbb;"
| 134 || August 31 || Pirates || 9–8 (10) || Williams (3–4) || Lee (3–2) || Silva (2) || 41,729 || 60–74	
|-

|-  style="text-align:center; background:#fbb;"
| 135 || September 1 || Pirates || 9–8 || Sauerbeck (3–0) || Veres (3–6) || Clontz (1) || 40,529 || 60–75	
|-  style="text-align:center; background:#bfb;"
| 136 || September 3 || @ Mets || 5–2 (10) || Leskanic (5–2) || Wendell (3–3) || Veres (27) || 36,102 || 61–75	
|-  style="text-align:center; background:#fbb;"
| 137 || September 4 || @ Mets || 4–2 || Leiter (11–9) || Bohanon (11–11) || Benítez (17) || 43,431 || 61–76	
|-  style="text-align:center; background:#fbb;"
| 138 || September 5 || @ Mets || 6–2 || Yoshii (10–8) || Kile (8–13) || || 49,117 || 61–77
|-  style="text-align:center; background:#bfb;"
| 139 || September 6 || @ Expos || 5–3 || Astacio (15–10) || Thurman (6–11) || Veres (28) || 7,698 || 62–77
|-  style="text-align:center; background:#fbb;"
| 140 || September 7 || @ Expos || 4–1 || Hermanson (7–12) || Thomson (1–7) || Urbina (34) || 5,517 || 62–78
|-  style="text-align:center; background:#bfb;"
| 141 || September 8 || @ Expos || 5–1 || Wright (2–2) || Smith (4–8) || || 5,548 || 63–78	
|-  style="text-align:center; background:#bfb;"
| 142 || September 10 || Brewers || 15–3 || Bohanon (12–11) || Pulsipher (4–6) || || 44,628 || 64–78
|-  style="text-align:center; background:#bfb;"
| 143 || September 11 || Brewers || 7–6 || DiPoto (4–4) || Coppinger (3–4) || Veres (29) || 44,566 || 65–78	
|-  style="text-align:center; background:#fbb;"
| 144 || September 12 || Brewers || 12–9 || Plunk (4–3) || Veres (3–7) || Wickman (31) || 42,085 || 65–79
|-  style="text-align:center; background:#fbb;"
| 145 || September 13 || Mets || 6–5 || Wendell (4–4) || Veres (3–8) || Benítez (20) || 40,547 || 65–80	
|-  style="text-align:center; background:#bfb;"
| 146 || September 14 || Mets || 7–2 || Wright (3–2) || Dotel (7–2) || || 41,090 || 66–80	
|-  style="text-align:center; background:#fbb;"
| 147 || September 15 || Mets || 10–5 || Wendell (5–4) || DiPoto (4–5) || Benítez (21) || 41,820 || 66–81
|-  style="text-align:center; background:#bfb;"
| 148 || September 17 || Dodgers || 18–10 || Hackman (1–0) || Checo (1–1) || || 44,170 || 67–81	
|-  style="text-align:center; background:#fbb;"
| 149 || September 18 || Dodgers || 5–4 || Park (11–10) || Astacio (15–11) || Shaw (33) || 44,945 || 67–82	
|-  style="text-align:center; background:#fbb;"
| 150 || September 19 || Dodgers || 5–2 (7) || Brown (17–8) || Thomson (1–8) || Borbón (1) || 41,952 || 67–83	
|-  style="text-align:center; background:#bfb;"
| 151 || September 20 || Diamondbacks || 12–7 || Wright (4–2) || Daal (15–9) || || 41,174 || 68–83
|-  style="text-align:center; background:#fbb;"
| 152 || September 21 || Diamondbacks || 7–6 || Olson (8–4) || Ramírez (1–5) || Mantei (30) || 41,559 || 68–84
|-  style="text-align:center; background:#fbb;"
| 153 || September 22 || Diamondbacks || 11–3 || Benes (12–12) || Hackman (1–1) || || 40,115 || 68–85
|-  style="text-align:center; background:#bfb;"
| 154 || September 24 || @ Marlins || 5–3 || Astacio (16–11) || Edmondson (5–8) || Veres (30) || 18,941 || 69–85
|-  style="text-align:center; background:#fbb;"
| 155 || September 25 || @ Marlins || 8–2 || Dempster (7–8) || Thomson (1–9) || || 27,271 || 69–86	
|-  style="text-align:center; background:#bfb;"
| 156 || September 26 || @ Marlins || 8–6 || Leskanic (6–2) || Medina (1–1) || Veres (31) || 26,012 || 70–86	
|-  style="text-align:center; background:#fbb;"
| 157 || September 27 || @ Diamondbacks || 10–3 || Anderson (7–2) || Bohanon (12–12) || || 35,360 || 70–87	
|-  style="text-align:center; background:#fbb;"
| 158 || September 28 || @ Diamondbacks || 9–3 || Benes (13–12) || Hackman (1–2) || || 31,447 || 70–88
|-  style="text-align:center; background:#bfb;"
| 159 || September 29 || @ Diamondbacks || 4–1 || Astacio (17–11) || Reynoso (10–6) || || 32,505 || 71–88	
|-

|-  style="text-align:center; background:#fbb;"
| 160 || October 1 || Giants || 9–4 || Ortiz (18–9) || Thomson (1–10) || || 41,302 || 71–89
|-  style="text-align:center; background:#fbb;"
| 161 || October 2 || Giants || 16–7 || Rueter (15–10) || Wright (4–3) || || 38,393 || 71–90	
|-  style="text-align:center; background:#bfb;"
| 162 || October 3 || Giants || 9–8 || Veres (4–8) || Embree (3–2) || || 40,117 || 72–90	
|-

Awards, league leaders, and accomplishments

National League leaders

Offensive statistics
 Batting champion: Larry Walker (.379) †
 Offensive win %: Larry Walker (.838) †
 On-base percentage: Larry Walker (.458) †
 On-base plus slugging percentage: Larry Walker (1.168) †
 Slugging percentage: Larry Walker (.710) †
 Triples: Neifi Pérez (11) †
 Notes: † – led MLB.  References:

Honors
 Canada's athletes of the 20th century #9 male athlete: Larry Walker
 Sports Illustrated 13th Greatest Sporting Figure in Canadian History: Larry Walker

Awards
 All-Star Game selection: Larry Walker (starter at right field)
 Colorado Rockies Player of the Year: Larry Walker
 Rawlings Gold Glove at outfield: Larry Walker
 Silver Slugger at outfield: Larry Walker

Farm system

See also

 List of Colorado Rockies team records
 List of Gold Glove Award winners at outfield
 List of Major League Baseball annual triples leaders
 List of Major League Baseball batting champions
 List of National League annual slugging percentage leaders
 List of Silver Slugger Award winners at outfield

References

External links
1999 Colorado Rockies at Baseball Reference
1999 Colorado Rockies team page at www.baseball-almanac.com

Colorado Rockies seasons
Colorado Rockies season
Colorado Rockies season
1990s in Denver